The A58 is a major road in Northern England running between Prescot, Merseyside and Wetherby, West Yorkshire.

Route from West to East
Its westbound start is at Prescot on the outskirts of Liverpool via Greater Manchester and West Yorkshire to the eastern terminus at Wetherby. The road goes through the following locations:

 St Helens 
 Ashton-in-Makerfield
 Hindley
 Westhoughton
 Bolton
 Bury
 Heywood
 Rochdale
 Littleborough 
 The Pennines
 Ripponden 
 Sowerby Bridge
 Halifax 
 Hipperholme
 Birkenshaw
 Drighlington
 New Farnley
 Leeds City Centre as the A58(M) motorway (part of the Leeds Inner Ring Road), 
 Scarcroft
 Bardsey
 Collingham 
 to its terminus at Wetherby

A58 road between Leeds and Wetherby
The original route between Leeds and Wetherby has a dual carriageway diverting from Roundhay Road/Wetherby Road, at the old Fforde Grene junction in Harehills. It runs along the Easterly Road dual carriageway passing Oakwood and Gipton. The re-routed A58 meets its original route at Boggart Hill in Seacroft. The re-routed section was constructed in the 1930s and had a branch of the Leeds Tramway running along the central reservation until the 1950s. The proposed Leeds Supertram was also to run this route.

Gallery

References

Google map of A58

External links

Roads in England
Roads in Yorkshire
Roads in Lancashire
Roads in Merseyside
Transport in West Yorkshire
Transport in Leeds